Malla Strict Nature Reserve (Mallan luonnonpuisto) is a strict nature reserve located in Lapland, Finland. The area has been protected since 1916 and was declared a strict nature reserve in 1938. It encompasses  and is managed by Metla. There is a trail in the park, access to this has to be separately organized. Most of the species found here can also be found on various places around Saana fell, which is accessible.

Enontekiö
Protected areas of the Arctic
Strict nature reserves of Finland
Geography of Lapland (Finland)